Engineering is the discipline and profession that applies scientific theories, mathematical methods, and empirical evidence to design, create, and analyze technological solutions cognizant of safety, human factors, physical laws, regulations, practicality, and cost. In the contemporary era, engineering is generally considered to consist of the major primary branches of chemical engineering, civil engineering, electrical engineering, and mechanical engineering. There are numerous other engineering sub-disciplines and interdisciplinary subjects that may or may not be part of these major engineering branches.

Chemical engineering

Chemical engineering is the application of chemical, physical and biological sciences to the process of converting raw materials or chemicals into more useful or valuable forms.

Civil engineering
Civil engineering comprises the design, construction, and maintenance of the physical and natural built environments.

Electrical engineering
Electrical engineering comprises the study and application of electricity, electronics and electromagnetism.

Mechanical engineering
Mechanical engineering comprises the design and analysis of heat and mechanical power for the operation of machines and mechanical systems.

Interdisciplinary

See also 

 Outline of engineering
 Social engineering
 Financial engineering

References

Branches